Keenan Simpson (born 7 January 1999) is a Canadian slalom kayaker. In 2019, he won the bronze medal in the men's K-1 event at the 2019 Pan American Games held in Lima, Peru. He also won the bronze medal in the men's extreme K-1 event.

References

External links 
 

Living people
1999 births
Place of birth missing (living people)
Canadian male canoeists
Pan American Games medalists in canoeing
Pan American Games bronze medalists for Canada
Canoeists at the 2019 Pan American Games
Medalists at the 2019 Pan American Games